Panariti is a village in the municipality of Xylokastro, in the north of the Corinth region, Greece. According to the 2011 census, the village had 349 residents.

At the turn of the 20th century, the village was renowned for its Black Corinth grapes, which are dried into Zante currants. The currants from Panariti were introduced to California in 1901 by botanist David Fairchild, and are still grown in California, Arizona and Nevada.

References

Populated places in Corinthia